Diego Benito Rey (born 25 August 1988) is a Spanish footballer who plays for Hércules CF as a midfielder.

Football career
Born in Madrid, Benito began his career with local Rayo Vallecano, spending several seasons with the reserves and helping them promote to Segunda División B in 2010. He made his debut with the first team on 29 January 2011, playing six minutes in a 3–0 away win against CD Numancia and totalling two appearances during the season as the club returned to La Liga after eight years.

Benito played again almost exclusively with the B-team in the 2011–12 campaign. He appeared in his first match in the top division on 12 February 2012, coming on as a substitute for Emiliano Armenteros in the dying minutes of a 2–0 home victory over Getafe CF.

On 10 August 2012, Benito joined another reserve team, Getafe CF B also in the third level. On 20 July of the following year, he moved to fellow league side Albacete Balompié after agreeing to a two-year contract.

On 11 August 2016, after suffering relegation, Benito signed a one-year deal with Real Murcia in the third division. He continued to compete in that tier in the following years, representing Elche CF, FC Cartagena and Hércules CF.

References

External links

1988 births
Living people
Footballers from Madrid
Spanish footballers
Association football midfielders
La Liga players
Segunda División players
Segunda División B players
Tercera División players
Rayo Vallecano B players
Rayo Vallecano players
Getafe CF B players
Albacete Balompié players
Real Murcia players
Elche CF players
FC Cartagena footballers
Hércules CF players